Dimipokhari  is a 2 no. Ward of Sunapati Rural Municipality in Ramechhap District which falls under 3 no. province of Nepal.It is located at north-eastern Nepal. At the time of the 1991 Nepal census it had a population of 2,997 people living in 626 individual households.

References

External links
UN map of the municipalities of Ramechhap District

Populated places in Ramechhap District